The lieutenant governor of British Columbia is the viceregal representative of the , in the province of British Columbia, Canada.  The office of lieutenant governor is an office of the Crown and serves as a representative of the monarchy in the province, rather than the governor general of Canada. The office was created in 1871 when the Colony of British Columbia joined the Confederation. Since then the lieutenant governor has been the representative of the monarchy in British Columbia. Previously, between 1858 and 1863 under colonial administration  the title of lieutenant governor of British Columbia was given to Richard Clement Moody as commander of the Royal Engineers, Columbia Detachment. This position coexisted with the office of governor of British Columbia served by James Douglas during that time.

The lieutenant governor of British Columbia is appointed in the same manner as the other provincial viceroys in Canada and is similarly tasked with carrying out most of the monarch's constitutional and ceremonial duties. The present, and 30th, lieutenant governor of British Columbia is Janet Austin, who has served in the role since 24 April 2018.

Role and presence

The lieutenant governor of British Columbia is vested with a number of governmental duties.

The viceroy is also expected to undertake various ceremonial roles. The lieutenant governor, him or herself a member and Chancellor of the order, will induct deserving individuals into the Order of British Columbia and, upon installation, automatically becomes a Knight or Dame of Justice and the Vice-Prior in British Columbia of the Most Venerable Order of the Hospital of Saint John of Jerusalem. The viceroy further presents other provincial honours and decorations, as well as various awards that are named for and presented by the lieutenant governor; these are generally created in partnership with another government or charitable organization and linked specifically to their cause. These honours are presented at official ceremonies, which count amongst hundreds of other engagements the lieutenant governor partakes in each year, either as host or guest of honour; the lieutenant governor of British Columbia undertook 350 engagements in 2006 and 390 in 2007.

At these events, the lieutenant governor's presence is marked by the lieutenant governor's standard, consisting of a blue field bearing the escutcheon of the Arms of  Majesty in Right of British Columbia, surmounted by a crown and surrounded by ten gold maple leaves, symbolizing the ten provinces of Canada. Within British Columbia, the lieutenant governor also follows only the sovereign in the province's order of precedence, preceding even other members of the Canadian Royal Family and the Canadian monarch's federal representative, the governor general of Canada.

History

The first British settlement in the area was the Colony of British Columbia (1858–66), of which the first lieutenant governor, from 1858 to 1863, was Richard Clement Moody, who had previously served as the first governor of the Falkland Islands. Moody selected the site for and founded the original capital of British Columbia – New Westminster – and established the Cariboo Road and Stanley Park. He named Burnaby Lake after his private secretary Robert Burnaby and named Port Coquitlam's  "Mary Hill" after his wife Mary. Port Moody is named after him.

This colony of British Columbia was amalgamated with the Colony of Vancouver Island to form the Colony of British Columbia (1866–71), which was succeeded by the present-day province of British Columbia following the Canadian Confederation of 1871, when the present office of the lieutenant governor of British Columbia came into being.

Since 1871, 28 lieutenant governors have served the province, amongst whom were notable firsts, such as David Lam—the first Asian-Canadian lieutenant governor in Canada—and Iona Campagnolo—the first female lieutenant governor of British Columbia. The shortest mandate by a lieutenant governor of British Columbia was Edward Gawler Prior, from 1919 to his death in 1920, while the longest was George Pearkes, from October 1960 to July 1968.

In 1903, before political parties were a part of British Columbia politics, Lieutenant Governor Henri-Gustave Joly de Lotbinière was the last lieutenant governor in Canada to dismiss from office an incumbent premier, Edward Gawler Prior; Prior had been found to have given an important construction contract to his own hardware business, though he was later appointed as lieutenant governor himself. In 1952, the lieutenant governor was, without a clear majority in the Legislature following the general election, required to exercise his personal judgement in selecting his premier. Though the Co-operative Commonwealth Federation (CCF) (now the New Democratic Party) held one fewer seat than the Social Credit Party (Socred), Lieutenant Governor Clarence Wallace was under pressure to call on the CCF leader to form the new Cabinet; however, Wallace went with Socred leader W.A.C. Bennett, which resulted in the start of a twenty-year dynasty for the latter.

See also

 Monarchy in the Canadian provinces
 Government of British Columbia
 Lieutenant governors of Canada

Bibliography

References

External links
 Lieutenant governor of British Columbia

British Columbia